Events in the year 1981 in Mexico.

Incumbents

Federal government
 President: José López Portillo
 Interior Secretary (SEGOB): Enrique Olivares Santana (until November 30), Manuel Bartlett Díaz (starting December 1)
 Secretary of Foreign Affairs (SRE): Jorge Castañeda y Álvarez 
 Communications Secretary (SCT): Emilio Mújica Montoya
 Secretary of Defense (SEDENA): Félix Galván López
 Secretary of Navy: Ricardo Cházaro Lara
 Secretary of Labor and Social Welfare: Pedro Ojeda Paullada
 Secretary of Welfare: Pedro Ramírez Vázquez
 Secretary of Public Education: Fernando Solana Morales
 Tourism Secretary (SECTUR): Rosa Luz Alegría Escamilla

Supreme Court

 President of the Supreme Court: Agustín Téllez Cruces

Governors

 Aguascalientes: Rodolfo Landeros Gallegos
 Baja California: Roberto de la Madrid (PRI)
 Baja California Sur: Alberto Andrés Alvarado Arámburo/Angel César Mendoza Arámburo
 Campeche: Juan Sabines Gutiérrez
 Chiapas: Oscar Ornelas
 Chihuahua: Francisco José Madero González
 Coahuila: Oscar Flores Tapia
 Colima: Griselda Álvarez
 Durango: José de las Fuentes Rodríguez
 Guanajuato: Enrique Velasco Ibarra
 Guerrero: Rubén Figueroa Figueroa/Alejandro Cervantes Delgado
 Hidalgo: Jorge Rojo Lugo/Guillermo Rossell de la Lama
 Jalisco: Flavio Romero de Velasco
 State of Mexico: Jorge Jiménez Cantú 
 Michoacán: Adán Augusto López Hernández
 Morelos: Armando León Bejarano (PRI)
 Nayarit: Antonio Echevarría García
 Nuevo León: Alfonso Martínez Domínguez
 Oaxaca: Pedro Vázquez Colmenares
 Puebla: Toxqui Fernández de Lara/Guillermo Jiménez Morales
 Querétaro: Rafael Camacho Guzmán
 Quintana Roo: Jesús Martínez Ross/Pedro Joaquín Coldwell
 San Luis Potosí: Carlos Jonguitud Barrios
 Sinaloa: Antonio Toledo Corro
 Sonora: Samuel Ocaña García
 Tabasco: Leandro Rovirosa Wade
 Tamaulipas: Emilio Martínez Manautou/Enrique Cárdenas González
 Tlaxcala: Tulio Hernández Gómez
 Veracruz: Agustín Acosta Lagunes
 Yucatán: Francisco Luna Kan
 Zacatecas: José Guadalupe Cervantes Corona
Regent of Mexico City: Carlos Hank González

Events
September 13 — By presidential decree, the Museo Nacional de las Intervenciones opens its doors in Churubusco.
Heavy rainfall associated with the cyclone caused moderate damage in northwestern Mexico, and at least seventy-three deaths can be attributed to the storm.
November – The Unified Socialist Party of Mexico is founded by a merger of four parties.

Awards
Belisario Domínguez Medal of Honor – Luis Alvarez Barret

Film

 List of Mexican films of 1981.

Sport

 1980–81 Mexican Primera División season.

Births
June 7 — Enzo Fortuny, voice actor
August 6 — José Ron, soap opera actor
December 5 – Adan Canto, actor
December 21 – Lynda Thomas, singer-songwriter and producer
Date unknown — Miriam Rivera, transgender model (d. 2019.

References

External links

 
Mexico
1981 establishments in Mexico